Anthony Page (21 September 1935 in Bangalore, Karnataka, India) is a British stage and film director.

Biography
When Page was 19, he went to Canada on a free passage with the Royal Canadian Air Force and hitchhiked to New York where he studied with Sanford Meisner. In 1964, he took over directing at the Royal Court when George Devine fell ill. He directed Inadmissible Evidence with Nicol Williamson.

Filmography
Inadmissible Evidence (1968)
Male of the Species (1969)
Pueblo (1973)
The Missiles of October (1974)
F. Scott Fitzgerald in Hollywood (1975)
Collision Course: Truman vs. MacArthur (1976)
I Never Promised You a Rose Garden (1977)
Absolution (1978)
The Lady Vanishes (1979)
F.D.R.: The Last Year (1980)
Bill (1981)
Johnny Belinda (1982)
Grace Kelly (1983)
Bill: On His Own (1983)
Murder: By Reason of Insanity (1985)
Second Serve (1986)
Monte Carlo (1986) (TV miniseries)
Pack of Lies (1987)
Scandal in a Small Town (1988)
The Nightmare Years (1989) (TV miniseries)
Chernobyl: The Final Warning (1991)
Silent Cries (1993)
Middlemarch (1994)
Human Bomb (1998)
My Zinc Bed (2008)

Select theatre credits
Inadmissible Evidence (1965-66) - Broadway
Heartbreak House (1883-84) - Broadway
A Doll's House (1997) - Broadway
Cat on a Hot Tin Roof (2003-04) - Broadway
Who's Afraid of Virginia Woolf? (2005)- Broadway
Waiting for Godot (2009) - Broadway

References

External links
 
 

1935 births
Living people
British film directors
British theatre directors
British television directors
Tony Award winners